Kakatiya Musical Garden is a musical garden located nearby the famous Bhadrakali temple in Warangal, Telangana.

Garden
The main attraction of the garden is a musical water fountain with the perfect synchronization of colorful lights.

Transport
Including TSRTC, many private services provide a very good transport facility to the garden.

References

Hanamkonda district
Parks in India
Tourist attractions in Warangal
Year of establishment missing